This is a list of songs that reached number one in Mexico in 1969, according to Billboard magazine with data provided by Radio Mil.

Chart history

By country of origin
Number-one artists:

Number-one compositions (it denotes the country of origin of the song's composer[s]; in case the song is a cover of another one, the name of the original composition is provided in parentheses):

See also
1969 in music

References

Sources
Print editions of the Billboard magazine from March 15 to December 27, 1969.

1969 in Mexico
Mexico singles
Lists of number-one songs in Mexico